Macrocirca is a genus of moths in the family Depressariidae. It contains only one species, Macrocirca strabo, which is found in Argentina.

References

Ethmiinae
Taxa named by Edward Meyrick
Monotypic moth genera
Moths of South America